Brown Ifeanyi "Browny" Igboegwu (30 August 1976 in Ozubulu, Anambra State) is an Igbo-Nigerian actor. His career in "Nollywood" began in 2005.

Education
Igboegwu had his secondary school education at the All Hallow Seminary Onitsha. He went on to graduate from the University of Nigeria, Nsukka with a degree in public administration and international relations.

Acting
In 2005, he visited his friend, director Oke Ozubeluoko, on the set of a film, and noticed that a particular actor was making several mistakes. Igboegwu commented that he "could do better even when [he] had no experience as an actor"; Ozubeluoko gave him the role, and was impressed by his proficiency for acting.

As of 2015, Igboegwu has featured in over eighty movies, from his first film, Expensive Error with Hanks Anuku, where he played a cultist. Igboegwu is perhaps best known for his role in the 2005 film Marry Me, with Nonso Diobi and Oge Okoye, among others.

Current activities
Igboegwu was named the twelfth chairman of the Anambra state chapter of the Actors Guild of Nigeria in late February 2015, and on 9 March, he was made the executive National Secretary, Conference of Chairmen, Actors Guild of Nigeria. As of early 2014, Igboegwu is married to his wife Becky.

Awards
He has received numerous awards within and outside the country from his alma mata to various organizations both small and big, within and outside the movie circle to celebrate his achievements and his strides towards the progress of the Nollywood movie industry in Nigeria.

 2013: City People Award, Best Supporting Actor.

Philanthropy
Igboegwu is the head of the board of trustees for Brownbourg Foundation of his Brownbourg Koncept media agency, some of his activities include visiting of various orphanages almost monthly and handing out relief materials.

References

21st-century Nigerian male actors
University of Nigeria alumni
Living people
1976 births
Nigerian male film actors
Igbo actors
Actors from Anambra State